Mount Allison is a mountain three nautical miles (6 km) northeast of Mount Stuart, in the Monument Nunataks. It was mapped by United States Geological Survey (USGS) from surveys and U.S. Navy air photos, 1960–64. Named by Advisory Committee on Antarctic Names (US-ACAN) for Richard G. Allison, biologist at McMurdo Station, summers 1965–66 and 1967–68.

Allison, Mount